Heitor Villa-Lobos's Étude No. 8, one of his Twelve Études for Guitar, was first published by Max Eschig, Paris, in 1953.

History
The first public performance of this étude (together with those of Études 1 and 7) was given by Andrés Segovia on 5 March 1947 at Wellesley College in Wellesley, Massachusetts.

Structure
The piece is in C-sharp minor and is marked Modéré.

Analysis
Étude No. 8 is a study in arpeggios and slurs. The main melody is introduced first in the bass, under the arpeggios, then is passed to the higher strings, and back and forth.

References

CIted sources

Further reading
 

Compositions by Heitor Villa-Lobos
Guitar études
Compositions in C-sharp minor